Visim is a rural locality (a selo) and the administrative center of Visimskoye Rural Settlement, Dobryansky District, Perm Krai, Russia. The population was 164 as of 2010. There are 11 streets.

Geography 
Visim is located 34 km north of Dobryanka (the district's administrative centre) by road. Olkhovka is the nearest rural locality.

References 

Rural localities in Dobryansky District